Rodrigo González de Marmolejo (1487–1564) was a Roman Catholic prelate who was appointed as the first Bishop of Santiago de Chile (1561–1564).

Biography
Rodrigo González de Marmolejo was born in Carmona, Spain in 1487 and ordained a priest in 1536.
On 27 Jun 1561, he was appointed during the papacy of Pope Pius IV as Bishop of Santiago de Chile.
He died before he was consecrated bishop on 9 Oct 1564.

References 

16th-century Roman Catholic bishops in Chile
Bishops appointed by Pope Pius IV
1487 births
1564 deaths
Roman Catholic bishops of Santiago de Chile